Anjani Putra is an Indian Kannada-language action film directed by A. Harsha and produced by M. N. Kumar. The film features Puneeth Rajkumar and Rashmika Mandanna in lead roles while Ramya Krishna, Mukesh Tiwari, P. Ravi Shankar and Chikkanna play supporting roles. Ravi Basrur composed the soundtrack and film score for the film, while cinematography and editing were handled by Swamy J. and Deepu S. Kumar respectively. The film was a remake of director Hari's Tamil film Poojai (2014).

The film was officially launched on 6 February 2017, and principal photography began a week later. The film's trailer was launched on 24 November 2017 along with an audio launch held by Puneeth Rajkumar owned PRK Audio company. The film was released on 21 December 2017 across Karnataka and received mixed reviews from critics.  It completed 50 days run and was declared Blockbuster at the box office.

Plot
Viraj aka Raj is Nelamangala-based moneylender and also the heir to the Raj Group, a cloth manufacturing company, until he was disowned by his mother and matriarch of his joint family Anjana Devi due to some misunderstanding. He meets a rich girl named Geetha at a mall and become friends. However, Geetha rejects his proposal due to status-issues, but later falls for his humble nature. 

One day, Raj saves the ASP of Nelamangala district Surya Prakash and his wife from a group of thugs who work for Bhairava, a Jodhpur-based businessman and hitman who frequently hires the North Indian killers to kill anyone to acquire their land and money. As Surya Prakash was transferred to Nelamangala district to investigate Bhairava's client case, The latter had planned to kill him. Bhairava also plans to illegally grab land sold to a village temple by Raj's late father Muthuraj. These two incidents cause enmity between Raj and Bhairava. 

When the land is formally sold to the temple, an irate Bhairava orders his henchman to assaults Raj's uncle Sathyaraju, following which Raj (having reconciled with his family) beats the henchman in retaliation and breaks his hands where he also fights Bhairava and thrashes him in full view of the public. Assisted by Surya Prakash and Geetha, Raj subdues Bhairava's henchmen Suri and thwarts all attempts by Bhairava to destroy his family and manages to arrest the North Indian killers leading to Bhairava's arrest warrant being issued. However, Bhairava's second wife stabs Anjana Devi during the temple festival with a venomous knife, but she survives. 

Learning of Anjana Devi's injury, Raj rushes to Jodhpur, where Bhairava is hiding and kills Bhairava's friend and contract killer Raj Thakur and fights the rest of the henchman. Finally he fights with Bhairava and brutually stabs him to death. Raj returns home and joins with his family along with Geetha and her family for a family portrait.

Cast
 Puneeth Rajkumar as Viraj, son of Anjana Devi
 Rashmika Mandanna as Geetha, Viraj's love interest 
 Ramya Krishna as Anjana Devi, Viraj's mother 
 Mukesh Tiwari as Bhairava (Contract Killing Head)
 P. Ravi Shankar as SP Surya Prakash
 Akhilendra Mishra as Raj Thakur
 V. Manohar as Geetha's father
 Seetha Kote as Geetha's mother
 Ratnakar Upadhayay as Geetha's Cousin
 Sadhu Kokila as Servant at Viraj's house
 Chikkanna as Chikkanna Servant at Viraj's house
 Girish shivanna as Karimale, Viraj's friend
 Harini Chandra as Viraj's aunt
 Cockroach Sudhi as Suri, Right hand of Bhairava
 Hariprriya as item number "1234 Shille Hodi"

Music

Ravi Basrur  had composed the songs and score for the film. Audio of the movie was sold to PRK Music owned by Puneeth Rajkumar himself. The audio was released on 24 November 2017 alongside the launch of PRK Music. The tune of "1234 Shille Hodi" was also used in Basrur's previous film Bilinder.

References

External links
 

2017 films
Indian action comedy films
2010s vigilante films
2017 action comedy films
Indian romantic action films
2017 masala films
Kannada remakes of Tamil films
2010s Kannada-language films
Films set in Bangalore
Films shot in Rajasthan
Films shot in Scotland
2017 romantic comedy films
Indian romantic comedy films
Films directed by Harsha
Films set in Rajasthan
Indian films about revenge
Indian vigilante films
2010s romantic action films